Leopold Sekongo (born 25 September 1969) is a Dutch draughts player of Ivorian origin. He was once Champion de Côte d'Ivoire.

References 

1969 births
Living people
Dutch draughts players
Players of international draughts
Ivorian expatriates in the Netherlands
Ivorian sportspeople
Ivorian sportsmen